The 1990 Georgia Bulldogs football team represented the University of Georgia during the 1990 NCAA Division I-A football season. The Bulldogs completed the season with a 4–7 record.

Schedule

References

Georgia
Georgia Bulldogs football seasons
Georgia Bulldogs football